George Edward Redwood (4 June 1885 – 24 November 1956) was an English professional footballer who played as a left back in the Football League for Fulham. He also played in the Southern League for West Ham United.

Personal life
Redwood served as a lance corporal in the Royal Fusiliers during the First World War and suffered a wound that necessitated the amputation of one of his arms.

Career statistics

References

1885 births
1956 deaths
English footballers
English Football League players
British Army personnel of World War I
Royal Fusiliers soldiers
Footballers from Shoreditch
Association football fullbacks
Enfield F.C. players
Fulham F.C. players
Southern Football League players
West Ham United F.C. players
English amputees
English disabled sportspeople
Association footballers with limb difference
Military personnel from London